Kevin Gregory Churko (born 19 January 1968) is a Canadian record producer, sound engineer and musician best known for his work with artists such as Ozzy Osbourne, Papa Roach, Hinder, Modern Science, Five Finger Death Punch, Disturbed, In This Moment, Shania Twain, and Hellyeah. He currently resides in Las Vegas, where he works out of his private studio, "The Hideout". He is the father of Kane Churko, and brother of Cory Churko.

Awards 

|-
| 2008
| "I Don't Wanna Stop" / "God Bless the Almighty Dollar" – Ozzy Osbourne
|  Juno Award Recording Engineer of the Year
| 
|-
| 2008
| "I Don't Wanna Stop" / "God Bless the Almighty Dollar" – Ozzy Osbourne
|  Juno Award Jack Richardson Producer of the Year
| 
|-
| 2008
| "I Don't Wanna Stop" – Ozzy Osbourne
|  Grammy Award for Best Hard Rock Performance
| 
|-
| 2009
| "Disappearing" / "The Big Bang" – Simon Collins
|  Juno Award Recording Engineer of the Year
| 
|-
| 2010
| "Look Where You're Walking" – Modern Science / "The Dream" – In This Moment
|  Juno Award Jack Richardson Producer of the Year
| 
|-
| 2010
| "Scream" – Ozzy Osbourne
|  Grammy Award for Best Hard Rock Performance
| 
|-
| 2011
| "Let It Die" / "Life Won't Wait" – Ozzy Osbourne
|  Juno Award Recording Engineer of the Year
| 
|-
| 2012
| "American Capitalist" – Five Finger Death Punch
| Revolver Golden Gods Awards Album of the Year
| 
|-
| 2012
| "American Capitalist" – Five Finger Death Punch
|  Radio Contraband Rock Radio Awards Album of the Year
| 
|-
| 2012
| "Coming Down" – Five Finger Death Punch
|  Radio Contraband Rock Radio Awards Song of the Year
| 
|-
| 2013
| "The Wrong Side of Heaven Vol. 1" – Five Finger Death Punch
|  Loudwire Music Awards Rock Album of the Year
| 
|-
| 2013
| "Life Me Up" – Five Finger Death Punch
|  Loudwire Music Awards Rock Song of the Year
| 
|-
| 2013
| "Blood" – In This Moment / "Coming Down" – Five Finger Death Punch
|  Juno Award Recording Engineer of the Year
| 
|-
| 2013
| "Blood / Adrenalize" – In This Moment
|  Juno Award Jack Richardson Producer of the Year
| 
|-
| 2014
| "The Wrong Side of Heaven" – Five Finger Death Punch / "Stardust" – Gemini Syndrome
|  Juno Award Recording Engineer of the Year
| 
|-
| 2014
| "The Wrong Side of Heaven Vol. 1" – Five Finger Death Punch
|  Revolver Golden Gods Album of the Year
| 
|-
| 2014
| "Lift Me Up" – Five Finger Death Punch
|  Revolver Golden Gods Song of the Year
| 
|-
| 2014
| "The Wrong Side of Heaven Vol. 1" – Five Finger Death Punch
|  Bandit Rock Awards Best International Album
| 
|-
| 2015
| "Got Your Six" – Five Finger Death Punch
|  Loundwire Music Awards Best Rock Album
| 
|-
| 2015
| "Wash It All Away" – Five Finger Death Punch
|  Loudwire Music Awards Best Rock Song
| 
|-
| 2015
| "Immortalized" – Disturbed
|  SiriusXM Octane Music Awards Album of the Year
| 
|-
| 2017
| "The Sound of Silence" – Disturbed
|  Grammy Award for Best Hard Rock Performance
| 
|-
| 2017
| "The Sound of Silence" – Disturbed
|  iHeartRadio Music Awards Rock Song of the Year
| 
|-
| 2017
| "The Sound of Silence" – Disturbed
|  iHeartRadio Music Awards Best Cover Song of the Year
| 
|-
| 2017
| "The Sound of Silence" – Disturbed
|  Loudwire Music Awards Best Rock Song
| 
|-
| 2017
| "Unleashed" – Skillet
|  Dove's Rock/Contemporary Album
| 
|-
| 2018
| "Unleashed Beyond" – Skillet
|  Dove's Rock/Contemporary Album
| 
|-
| 2019
| "And Justice for None..." – Five Finger Death Punch
|  Bandit rock Awards Best International Album
| 
|-
| 2020
| "Victorious" – Skillet
|  Dove's Rock/Contemporary Album
| 
|-
| 2021
| "The In-Between" – In This Moment
|  Grammy's Best Metal Performance
| 
|-

Discography 

2000 – Britney Spears – Oops!... I Did It Again
2000 – The Corrs – In Blue
2002 – Shania Twain – Up
2002 – Michael Bolton – Only a Woman Like You
2002 – Celine Dion – A New Day Has Come
2004 – Robert Downey Jr. – The Futurist
2005 – Ozzy Osbourne – Under Cover
2005 – Ringo Starr – Choose Love
2007 – Ozzy Osbourne – Black Rain
2008 – Simon Collins – U-Catastrophe
2008 – In This Moment – The Dream
2009 – Modern Science – Modern Science
2009 – Five Finger Death Punch – War Is the Answer
2010 – Ozzy Osbourne – Scream
2010 – In This Moment – A Star-Crossed Wasteland
2010 – Slash – Slash
2010 – Hinder – All American Nightmare
2011 – Emerson Drive – Decade of Drive
2011 – Five Finger Death Punch – American Capitalist
2012 – Kobra and the Lotus – Kobra and the Lotus
2012 – In This Moment – Blood
2013 – Rob Zombie – Venomous Rat Regeneration Vendor
2013 – Five Finger Death Punch – The Wrong Side of Heaven and the Righteous Side of Hell, Volume 1
2013 – Asking Alexandria – From Death to Destiny
2013 – Five Finger Death Punch – The Wrong Side of Heaven and the Righteous Side of Hell, Volume 2
2013 – Gemini Syndrome – Lux
2014 – Ozzy Osbourne – Memoirs of a Madman
2014 – Hellyeah – Blood for Blood
2014 – In This Moment – Black Widow
2015 – Papa Roach – F.E.A.R
2015 – Apocalyptica – Shadowmaker
2015 – Disturbed  –Immortalized
2015 – Five Finger Death Punch – Got Your Six
2015 – Escape the Fate – Hate Me
2016 – Hellyeah – Undeniable
2016 – Skillet – Unleashed
2016 – Gemini Syndrome – Memento Mori
2017 – In This Moment – Ritual
2018 – Five Finger Death Punch – And Justice for None
2018 – Halestorm – Vicious
2018 – Disturbed – Evolution
2019 – Hellyeah – Welcome Home
2019 – Skillet – Victorious
2020 – Five Finger Death Punch – F8
2020 – In This Moment – Mother
2020 – Cory Marks – Who I Am
2021 – Ded – School of Thought
2022 – Skillet – Dominion
2022 – Five Finger Death Punch – AfterLife
2022 – Five Finger Death Punch – The Way of the Fist: 15th Anniversary Re-recording

References

External links

1968 births
Canadian audio engineers
Canadian expatriate musicians in the United States
Canadian record producers
Canadian songwriters
Living people
Musicians from Saskatchewan
People from Moose Jaw
Juno Award for Recording Engineer of the Year winners